Maiduguri  is the capital and the largest city of Borno State in north-eastern Nigeria. The city sits along the seasonal Ngadda River which disappears into the Firki swamps in the areas around Lake Chad. Maiduguri was founded in 1907 as a military outpost by the British and has since grown rapidly with a population exceeding a million by 2007.

History

Early period
The region was home to the Kanem-Bornu Empire for centuries. Maiduguri actually consists of two cities: Yerwa to the West and Old Maiduguri to the east.

Yerwa was founded in 1907 by Abubakar Garbai of Borno as the capital of the Bornu Kingdom. The location had before that been a small village known as Kalwa. This involved the transfer of the capital of the Kanuri people from Kukawa.

Old Maiduguri was selected by the British as their military headquarters in 1908 replacing Mafoni. The same year it became the location for the British Resident Commissioner over British Bornu. Maiduguri was not a City until 1960 when Nigeria became gained independence.

In 1957 Yerwa became the designated name for the urban centre while Maiduguri was officially applied as the name of the surrounding rural area.

In 1964 the railway was extended here which led to its rise as a major commercial center in the region.

The city was once known as a "hub of Islamic scholarship in West Africa that ... [taught] tolerance and hospitality like its welcoming neem trees."

Maiduguri is one of the fifteen Local Government Areas (LGAs) that constitute the Borno Emirate, a traditional state located in Borno State, Nigeria.

Islamist violence
Since the mid-1960s, Maiduguri has witnessed outbreaks of large inter-religious riots. Members of religious sects led intercommunal violence in 1982 and 2001.

On 18 February 2006, riots related to the Muhammad cartoons published by the Danish newspaper Jyllands-Posten left at least 15 people dead, and resulted in the destruction of approximately 12 churches. Soldiers and police quelled the riots, and the government temporarily imposed a curfew.

In 2002, Muslim cleric Mohammed Yusuf founded the Islamist group Boko Haram in Maiduguri, establishing a mosque and a madrasa that attracted children from poor Muslim families from both Nigeria and neighboring countries.

Boko Haram attacks 
The city is the heart of the Boko Haram insurgency and is the city which is most often attacked by the group. In late July 2009, Maiduguri was the worst-hit location of major religious violence in northern Nigeria committed by Boko Haram, which left over 700 people dead.

On 14 May 2013, President Goodluck Jonathan declared a state of emergency in northeast Nigeria, including Borno State, due to the militant activity of Boko Haram. The entire city was under overnight curfew, and trucks have been prevented from entering the city. Twelve areas of the city that are known to be strongholds of Boko Haram are under permanent curfew. On 18 June 2013, Boko Haram militants attacked a school as students were taking an exam; nine students were killed.

In 2014, Boko Haram bombed Maiduguri in January, July and November.

On 10 January 2015, a bomb attack was executed at the Monday Market in Maiduguri, killing 19 people. In the early hours of 25 January, Boko Haram launched a major assault on the city. On 26 January, CNN reported that the attack on Maiduguri by "hundreds of gunmen" had been repelled, but the nearby town of Monguno was captured by Boko Haram. The Nigerian Army claimed to have successfully repelled another attack on Maiduguri on 31 January 2015.
On 17 February 2015, Monguno subsequently fell to the Nigerian military in a coordinated air and ground assault.

On 7 March 2015, five suicide bomb blasts left 54 dead and 143 wounded. On 30 May 2015, Boko Haram launched another attack on the city, killing thirteen people.
In March 2017 Boko Haram again bombed Maiduguri.

Giwa barracks
The Giwa barracks and detention centre in Maiduguri has been subject to multiple attacks by Boko Haram. In 2014, reports suggested that 600 people were killed in an attack, though most were detainees killed by soldiers. It was attacked in January/February 2015, bombed in March 2015, and attacked again in May 2015.

In May 2016, Amnesty International released a report on the Giwa barracks detention centre, calling it a "place of death." The report alleges the facilities house about 1,200 people (including 120 children) and that many of these were detained arbitrarily. It further claims that 149 detainees had died in the first half of 2016, including 11 children. In 2019, Amnesty International (AI) and Concerned Nigerians (CN) called for investigation into alleged abuse of women and children in the facility.

Tramadol addiction has become a concern in the Maiduguri region, as Boko Haram fighters and local residents turn to the drug to cope with physical pain, personal loss, and the emotional consequences of violence.

Climate
Köppen-Geiger climate classification system classifies its climate as hot semi-arid (BSh).

Tree planting was a priority of the city's colonial administration, and large trees along major roads give protection from intense sun.

Normal temperature in Maiduguri 
The hot season goes on for 2.4 months, from March 13 to May 26, with a typical everyday high temperature above 102 °F. The most blazing month of the year in Maiduguri is May, with a typical high of 103 °F and low of 79 °F.

The cool season goes on for 2.1 months, from July 20 to September 23, with a typical everyday high temperature underneath 92 °F. The coldest month of the year in Maiduguri is January, with a typical low of 59 °F and high of 92 °F

Demographics

Maiduguri is estimated to have a population of 1,907,600, as of 2007.

Its residents are mostly Muslim including Kanuri, Hausa, Shuwa, Bura, Marghi, and Fulani ethnic groups. There is also a considerable Christian population and people from Southern states such as the Igbo, Ijaw, and Yoruba.

Maiduguri had 22 internally displaced persons camps in 2019, including Shagari camp with 48 households, and Cherubim & Seraphim camp with 65 households. The NYC (National Youth Service) in Maiduguri housed 4,800 displaced people in 2016. Goni Kachallari had 340 families in 2016.

Languages spoken in the camps include Fulani, Fulfulde, Gamargu, Hausa (8.4% native speakers), Kanuri (53.5% native speakers), Shuwa Arabic, and Marghi (15.6%). About a third of survey respondents had comprehension of a simple English audio sample; close to 100% had comprehension of audio messaging in either Hausa or Kanuri.

Transport 
The city lies at the end of a railway line connecting Port Harcourt, Enugu, Kafanchan, Kuru, Bauchi, and finally Maiduguri.

The city is served by the Maiduguri International Airport.

Economy
Maiduguri is the principal trading hub for north-eastern Nigeria. Its economy is largely based on services and trade with a small share of manufacturing.

Maiduguri is home to three markets which include a modern "Monday market". that has a spectacular image view.

The city has an appealing layout, with wide, well-maintained streets, sidewalks and flood management ditches. Electricity is provided by grid connections, solar power and by generators. The values of land and properties are high. A 2009 survey of property markets in Nigeria positioned Maiduguri as the third most expensive for buying and renting in after Abuja and Lagos.

A journalist who described local commerce wrote that "on the edge of the city, never-ending lines of lorries spend days waiting to take their cargoes to Dikwa and beyond to neighbouring Cameroon."

"Transport of goods to land-locked countries such as Chad, Central African Republic and Sudan" has suffered due to road ambushes.

Rural-urban migration to Maiduguri, combined with migration from Chad, Niger and Cameroon, has led to increases in poverty and unemployment

Firewood gathering is a source of income for newer residents who have been displaced by violence, and the harvest shortfalls resulting from climate change. Members of Maiduguri's official Association of Firewood Sellers provide labor for tree replanting efforts.

An additional source of support for displaced persons is a mobile phone-based cash distribution site which was set up by the World Food Programme and the Nigerian Government.

Education

The University of Maiduguri was founded in 1975. There is also the College of Medical Sciences. Other higher institutions include the Borno State University, Ramat Polytechnic, College of Agriculture and College of Education, Muhammad Goni College of Legal and Islamic Studies, College of Nursing and Midwifery, College of Health Technology and El-kanemi College of Islamic Theology, Annahada College of Science and Islamic Studies.

As of 2011, the Future Prowess Islamic School provided a free, co-ed Western and Islamic education to orphans and vulnerable children.

Places of worship 
Among places of worship are predominantly Muslim mosques. There are also Christian churches and temples: Church of Nigeria (Anglican Communion), Church of the Brethren in Nigeria (EYN), Presbyterian Church of Nigeria (World Communion of Reformed Churches), Nigerian Baptist Convention (Baptist World Alliance), Living Faith Church Worldwide, Redeemed Christian Church of God, Assemblies of God, Roman Catholic Diocese of Maiduguri (Catholic Church).

Sports and leisure
It is home to the El-Kanemi Warriors, a football team and the city has an active local football league. The Kyarimi Park is the oldest and largest zoo in Nigeria. The zoo attracts thousands of visitors per year. The city is within a short driving distance to picnic areas in Alo Lake and Zambiza game reserve.

See also
 Railway stations in Nigeria
 University of Maiduguri

References

Further reading
Maiduguri: The jewel in the Sahara. Ikenna Emewu. Daily Sun (Nigeria), 7 August 2004.
"Maiduguri." Encyclopædia Britannica. 2009. Encyclopædia Britannica Online. accessed 3 April 2009
Nigeria's Borno state adopts Sharia. Barnaby Phillips, BBC. Saturday, 19 August 2000.
Nigerian photographer captures Maiduguri life beyond Boko Haram, 23-9-2016
Rupert Kawka (ed), Ibrahim Walad, Frauke Jäger, Rupert Kawka et al. From Bulamari to Yerwa to Metropolitan Maiduguri. Interdisciplinary Studies on the Capital of Borno State, Nigeria. Series: Westafrikanische Studien Volume 24. Rüdiger Köppe Verlag, Cologne (2002)  

 
Populated places in Borno State
State capitals in Nigeria
Populated places established in 1907
Local Government Areas in Borno State
Cities in Nigeria
Disaster recovery